Quinn Fordham Gray Sr. (born May 21, 1979) is a former American football quarterback who played for four seasons in the National Football League and one season each in the United Football League and NFL Europe. He played college football at Florida A&M. He was signed by the Jacksonville Jaguars as an undrafted free agent in 2002. He played for the Frankfurt Galaxy in 2003 and the Jaguars from 2005–2007. During the 2008 off-season, Gray temporarily joined both the Houston Texans and Indianapolis Colts before joining the Kansas City Chiefs for the 2008 season. He ended his professional football career playing for the New York Sentinels of the United Football League in 2009.Head Football Coach at Albany State University

Early years
Gray attended Dillard High School in Fort Lauderdale, Florida, and was a letterman. He was a star in football as a quarterback, in baseball as a pitcher, and in basketball. In football, he won All-Region and All-District honors.

College career
Gray decided to attend Florida A&M University and set several FAMU records as a football player, including all-time leader in passing yards (7,378), all-time leader in pass attempts (1,113), all time leader in pass completions (562) and all-time leader in TD passes (57). He also holds the school's single-game record for most pass attempts (65 vs. North Carolina A&T in 2001).

Professional career

Jacksonville Jaguars
In 2002, Gray attended training camp with the Jacksonville Jaguars, appearing in three preseason games, completing 5 of 8 passes for 55 yards and one interception. In 2003, he was allocated to NFL Europe, where he led the Frankfurt Galaxy to a win in World Bowl XI.

He attended the Jaguars training camp the next year, winning the 3rd quarterback position. He first saw action in a regular season game with the season finale against the Tennessee Titans in the 2005 season, completing 14 passes for 100 yards, 2 touchdowns, and no interceptions for a passer rating of 119.0. He again saw action in the 2006 season finale versus the Kansas City Chiefs, entering the game to replace David Garrard in the third quarter. Down 28-10, he nearly led the Jaguars to a comeback, completing 13 of 22 passes 166 yards, with no interceptions, and rushing for 26 yards and 2 touchdowns.

In October 2007, he became starting quarterback of the Jaguars due to an injury to Garrard.  Gray went 2-1 as the starter. He also started the last game of the season against Houston Texans, losing 42-28. Gray became an unrestricted free agent following the 2007 season.

Houston Texans
On March 24, 2008, the Houston Texans signed Gray to a one-year, $645,000 contract. He was released by the team on June 9.

Indianapolis Colts
With quarterback Peyton Manning out of the early portion of 2008 Training Camp with a knee injury, Gray signed with the Indianapolis Colts.  He was released on August 30, 2008.

Kansas City Chiefs
On October 22, 2008, Gray was signed by the Kansas City Chiefs after quarterbacks Brodie Croyle and Damon Huard were placed on injured reserve. In a game against the Buffalo Bills in week 11, Gray made his only appearance of the season when he came in during the last minutes of a blowout. He completed 6 straight passes on his first drive, including a touchdown to Dwayne Bowe. On his next drive, he completed another pass and topped off his dominant performance with a 27 yard run as time expired. This would be the highlight of his career. The Chiefs released Gray on March 11, 2009.

New York Sentinels
Gray was signed by the New York Sentinels of the United Football League on August 5, 2009. He was released before the team's 2010 season began in Hartford, Connecticut.

Coaching career
In 2017, Gray became head coach at Lincoln High School in Tallahassee, Florida. He left the position in 2020 to become quarterbacks coach at Alcorn State University.

Albany State 
On January 23, 2023, Albany State hired Gray to be their next head coach.

References

External links
Just Sports Stats
Houston Texans bio 
Indianapolis Colts bio 
Jacksonville Jaguars bio 
Kansas City Chiefs bio 
United Football League bio

1979 births
Living people
Players of American football from Fort Lauderdale, Florida
American football quarterbacks
Florida A&M Rattlers football players
Jacksonville Jaguars players
Alcorn State Braves football coaches
Albany State Golden Rams football coaches
Frankfurt Galaxy players
Houston Texans players
Indianapolis Colts players
Kansas City Chiefs players
New York Sentinels players